Governor Lounsbury may refer to:

George E. Lounsbury (1838–1904), 58th Governor of Connecticut
Phineas C. Lounsbury (1841–1925), 53rd Governor of Connecticut